J-Rocks is an Indonesian rock band formed in 2003 consists of Iman (lead vocals, rhythm guitar), Sony (lead guitar), Wima (bass guitar) and Anton (drums). Their music is mainly heavily influenced by Japanese rock bands. J-Rocks fans are called J-Rockstars.

The band's name, "J-Rocks", comes from "J" and "Rockstar". “J” representing their origin, Jakarta; and they wanted their fans to be called as the “Rockstars” that they are, then abbreviated as “Rocks”.

History
In 2004, J-Rocks, competed at the music competition, Nescafe Get Started, in Jakarta that were sponsored by a record label, Aquarius Musikindo. They managed to win the competition and the opportunity to contribute in a compilation album, Nescafe Get Started, which was the beginning of their cooperation with Aquarius Musikindo. Finally, they succeeded in launching their debut album, Topeng Sahabat, with record label Aquarius Musikindo in 2005 and also filled two songs on the soundtrack album of the motion picture Dealova. Those songs were "Serba Salah" and "Into The Silent".

The band started to gain popularity since their second album, Spirit, in 2007. They played a variety of musical styles in the album, including: rock 'n roll, waltz, symphonic metal, blues, classical music, and others. In the single "Kau Curi Lagi", they collaborated with a female guitarist, Prisa Rianzi. They also made a music video in Japan for the single "Juwita Hati". It was handled by music video director Hedy Suryawan. Some regions in Japan, including Shibuya and Harajuku were used as the shooting location. That music video has increased J-Rocks' popularity quite significantly in Indonesia.

Abbey Road Studios
J-Rocks made their mark as the first Indonesian band to have recorded at the world-famous Abbey Road studios in the United Kingdom. The recording and mixing process were performed during the five days from 12 to 16 October 2008. At Abbey Road studios, they were helped by Chris Butler, a renowned sound engineer. The result was their EP album, Road to Abbey, which contained 5 songs, released in 2009. The album cover's image portrayed band members crossing Abbey Road's zebra cross, imitating the style of The Beatles in the 1969 album, Abbey Road.

Band members
 Iman Taufik Rachman — lead vocals, rhythm guitar 
 Sony Ismail Robayani — lead guitar 
 Swara Wimayoga — bass guitar 
 Anton Rudi Kelces — drums

Discography

Studio albums

EPs

Awards and nominations

References

External links
 J-Rocks at Aquarius Musikindo
 J-Rocks at Facebook
 J-Rockstars at Multiply
 J-Rocks discography on iTunes
 J-Rocks discography on Discogs
 J-Rocks Instagram on Instagram

Anugerah Musik Indonesia winners
Indonesian alternative rock groups
Musical groups established in 2003
Pop rock groups